Laag is commonly used for a South Tyrolean, Italian Frazione. It may also refer to:
 Laag (TV series) – a Pakistani drama.
 Låg – a Germanic adjective and last name (e.g., Jul Låg and David Låg Tomasi)
 Liwa Assad Allah al-Ghalib fi al-Iraq wa al-Sham, often shortened to LAAG – a Shia Muslim militant group involved in the Syrian Civil War and Iraqi Civil War (2014–2017)